Suzie Tanefo (born 22 May 1969) is a retired Cameroonian sprinter who specialized in the 400 metres.

At the 1987 Central African Games she won the silver medals in both 200 and 400 metres. She also competed at the 1991 World Championships and the 1992 Summer Olympics without reaching the final.

Her personal best time was 52.88 seconds, achieved in 1989.

References

External links
 

1969 births
Living people
Cameroonian female sprinters
Athletes (track and field) at the 1992 Summer Olympics
Olympic athletes of Cameroon
World Athletics Championships athletes for Cameroon
Place of birth missing (living people)
20th-century Cameroonian women